Kommuru (historically known as Rajagopalapuram) is a small village in Krishna district, Andhra Pradesh, India. It was once a part of the Nuzvidu taluka but is now administered as part of Aagiripalli mandal. Formerly part of the Suravaram panchayat, it now has its own panchayat named Kommuru panchayat.

Economy
Mango cultivation is the mainstay of the local economy.

Villages in Krishna district